The 2012 Iowa State Cyclones football team represented Iowa State University in the 2012 NCAA Division I FBS football season. The Cyclones were led by fourth-year head coach Paul Rhoads and played their home games at Jack Trice Stadium. They were a member of the Big 12 Conference. They finished the season 6–7, 3–6 in Big 12 play, to finish in ninth place. They were invited to the Liberty Bowl, where they lost to Tulsa, whom they had defeated in the opening game of the season.

Personnel

Coaching staff

Schedule

*Game shown on ABC stations in Iowa.

Game summaries

Game 1: vs. Tulsa Golden Hurricane

Game 2: at Iowa Hawkeyes

Game 3: vs. Western Illinois Leathernecks

Game 4: vs. Texas Tech Red Raiders

Game 5: at TCU Horned Frogs

Game 6: vs. Kansas State Wildcats

Game 7: at Oklahoma State Cowboys

Game 8: vs. Baylor Bears

Game 9: vs. Oklahoma Sooners

Game 10: at Texas Longhorns

Game 11: at Kansas Jayhawks

Game 12: vs. West Virginia Mountaineers

Game 13: vs. Tulsa Golden Hurricane

Rankings
In the preseason USA Today Coaches' Poll and Associated Press Top 25 Poll Iowa State didn't receive any points. In the week one (September 2) coaches poll Iowa State was ranked T–40th receiving 10 points. In the week one (September 2) AP poll Iowa State was ranked T–38th with 3 points. In the week two (September 9) coaches poll Iowa State was ranked 40th receiving 10 points. In the week two (September 9) AP poll Iowa State was ranked T–39th with 5 points. In the week three (September 16) coaches poll Iowa State was ranked T–31st receiving 29 points. In the week three (September 16) AP poll Iowa State was ranked 33rd with 15 points. In the week four (September 23) coaches poll Iowa State was ranked 29th receiving 45 points. In the week four (September 23) AP poll Iowa State was ranked 32nd with 16 points. In the week five (September 30) coaches poll Iowa State was not ranked and didn't receive any votes. In the week five (September 30) AP poll Iowa State was ranked T–38th with 3 points. In the week six (October 7) coaches poll Iowa State was ranked 25th receiving 73 points. In the week six (October 7) AP poll Iowa State was ranked 28th with 54 points.

References

Iowa State
Iowa State Cyclones football seasons
Iowa State Cyclones football